Stenalia balcanica is a beetle in the genus Stenalia of the family Mordellidae. It was described in 1949.

References

balcanica
Beetles described in 1949